Alexis Lavigne (March 26, 1812 - February 21, 1886) was a French tailor and inventor. He invented the couture mannequin and the supple measuring tape.

In 1841, he established the first fashion school in the world, Guerre-Lavigne, which became ESMOD in 1976.

References

French fashion designers
19th-century French inventors
1886 deaths
1812 births